The Institute of Transport Economics (Transportøkonomisk institutt –TØI) is a national, Norwegian institution for multidisciplinary transport research. Its mission is to develop and disseminate transportation knowledge of scientific quality and practical application. The Institute is an independent, non-profit research foundation. It holds no interests in any commercial, manufacturing or supplying organisation.

TØI has a multidisciplinary research environment with approximately 90 employees, of which about 70 are researchers. The Institute will normally have at least 200 research projects in progress at any one time, most of them being commissioned.

Its sphere of activity includes most of the current issues in road, rail, sea and air transport, as well as urban mobility, environmental sustainability and road safety. In recent years the Institute has been engaged in more than 70 research projects under EU's Research Framework Programmes.

References

External links
 Official site

Research institutes in Norway
Foundations based in Norway
Defunct government agencies of Norway
Government agencies established in 1954
Engineering research institutes
1954 establishments in Norway